Clubiona nigromaculosa is a sac spider species found in the Seychelles and Réunion.

See also 
 List of Clubionidae species

References

External links 

Clubionidae
Spiders of Africa
Spiders of Réunion
Arthropods of Seychelles
Spiders described in 1877
Taxobox binomials not recognized by IUCN